The Kichi-Kemin is a river in Kemin District of Chüy Region of Kyrgyzstan and Korday District of Kazakhstan. It is a right tributary of the Chu in Chüy Valley.

Course
The source of the Kichi-Kemin is high in the shoots of Trans-Ili Alatau in Kyrgyzstan. The river passes through urban-type settlement Ak-Tüz and flows to the southwest in a narrow gorge. Further on, it passes through the village of Ilyich and enters the Kichi-Kemin Valley. The Kichi-Kemin River then turns west and passes near the villages of Kichi-Kemin, Boroldoy, and Beysheke. In Kazakhstan, it passes near the villages Karasay batyr and Enbek gradually approaching the Chu River, and flowing into it near Chym-Korgon.

Ecology and environment

Contamination

Environmental monitoring

References

Rivers of Kyrgyzstan
Rivers of Kazakhstan
Tian Shan